This is a list of Brazilian films released in 2012.

See also
2012 in Brazil
2012 in Brazilian television

References

2012
Films
Brazilian